The Daphni Cave is a cave in Attica, Greece, that was sacred to the god Pan. It is located near the Byzantine monastery.

References

Attica
Caves of Greece